Peggy Johnson may refer to:

Peggy Johnson, CEO of Magic Leap
Peggy Johnson (murder victim), a formerly unidentified murder victim
Peggy Johnson, wife of Jim Bean
Peggy Johnson, wife of Barry Goldwater
Peggy Johnson, wife of Lee Iacocca
Peggy Johnson, fictional character in The Spirit of '76 (1917 film)
Peggy Johnson (bishop) on List of bishops of the United Methodist Church

See also
Margaret Johnson (disambiguation)